Star is a 2014 Russian comedy-drama film directed by Anna Melikian.

Plot
Young Masha desperately wants to become a star, she saves money for plastic surgery and in parallel, persistently goes to castings and looks after a lonely old man to earn money. Mature Rita is the lover of the deputy minister, who wants to become pregnant and marry him. Kostya is the son of a deputy minister, who is constantly in conflict with his father and Rita, but falls in love with Masha when he meets her.

After quarreling, Rita is forced to leave her lover's house, and meets Masha by chance.

Cast 
 Tinatin Dalakishvili as Masha
 Severija Janušauskaitė as Rita 
 Pavel Tabakov as Kostya
 Andrey Smolyakov as Sergey Vladimirovich
 Juozas Budraitis as old man

Awards
 Kinotavr: 
 Best Director (Anna Melikian) 
 Best Actress (Severija Janušauskaitė)
 V Odesa International Film Festival:
 Special Jury Prize (Tinatin Dalakishvili)
 Golden Eagle Award:
 Best Supporting Actress (Severija Janušauskaitė)

References

External links 

2014 comedy-drama films
Russian comedy-drama films
Mars Media films